Military time zones are defined in the ACP 121(I) standard, which is used by the armed forces for Australia, Canada, New Zealand, the United Kingdom, the United States, and many other nations. The names are identical to the NATO phonetic alphabet.

Going east from the prime meridian at Greenwich, letters "Alfa" to "Mike" (skipping "J", see below) represent the 12 time zones with positive UTC offsets until reaching the international Date Line. Going west from Greenwich, letters "November" to "Yankee" represent zones with negative offsets.

The letters are typically used in conjunction with military time. For example, 6:00 a.m. in zone UTC−5 is written "0600R" and spoken "zero six hundred Romeo".

The letter "J" ("Juliet"), originally skipped, may be used to indicate the observer's local time.

The letter "Z" ("Zulu") indicates Coordinated Universal Time (UTC).

History

Sandford Fleming devised a system assigning the letters A-Y excluding J to 1-hour time zones, which may have been the inspiration for the system.

The standard was first distributed by NATO as a note in 1950. The note states "This method is based on the systems in use in the Armed Forces of these countries and the United States".

See also
 Lists of time zones
 Time zone abolition

References

Military/NATO/Letter time zones

External links
 "Military" time zones discussion on the tz mailing list